Pop Virus is the fifth studio album by Gen Hoshino, released in 2018.

The first track of the album, also named "Pop Virus", is playable in the 2019 video game Death Stranding.

Track listing

Charts

Weekly charts

Year-end charts

Accolades

References

Gen Hoshino albums
2018 albums